Milan Škoda (born 16 January 1986) is a Czech professional footballer who plays as a forward for Czech First League club Mladá Boleslav. He has played for the Czech Republic national football team at international level.

Club career

Slavia Prague 
Škoda came to Slavia as a striker but he had to play as a central defender in season 2013–14. The following season he moved forward again scoring 19 goals and he became Slavia fan's favorite.

On 9 May 2018, Škoda played as Slavia Prague won the 2017–18 Czech Cup final against FK Jablonec. On 5 January 2019, he signed a new contract with Slavia Prague, until 30 June 2020.

Çaykur Rizespor 
On 11 January 2020, Škoda signed a contract with Çaykur Rizespor.

Mladá Boleslav 
On 6 July 2021, Škoda signed a contract with FK Mladá Boleslav.

International career
Škoda made his senior international debut for the Czech Republic on 12 June 2015 in a 2–1 away loss to Iceland in UEFA Euro 2016 qualifying, coming on as a substitute for Lukáš Vácha in the 79th minute. He scored his first two international goals against Kazakhstan in Euro 2016 qualifying. Škoda later represented the Czech Republic at the tournament proper, and scored the first goal in a 2-2 draw against Croatia in the group stage.

Career statistics

Club

International

Scores and results list Czech Republic's goal tally first, score column indicates score after each Škoda goal.

Honours
Slavia Prague
 Czech First League: 2016–17, 2018–19
 Czech Cup: 2017–18, 2018–19

Individual
 Czech First League top scorer: 2016–17

References

External links

 
 

Living people
1986 births
Footballers from Prague
Czech footballers
Association football forwards
Czech First League players
Bohemians 1905 players
SK Slavia Prague players
Czech Republic international footballers
UEFA Euro 2016 players
Çaykur Rizespor footballers
Czech expatriate footballers
Expatriate footballers in Turkey
Czech expatriate sportspeople in Turkey
FK Mladá Boleslav players
Czech National Football League players